NFL Blitz 2001 is a video game developed and published by Midway for the Dreamcast, PlayStation, Nintendo 64 and Game Boy Color in 2000.

Gameplay
NFL Blitz 2001 features new additions, including an instant replay feature, five mini-games, and various other options.

Reception
The Dreamcast version received "generally favorable reviews", while the Nintendo 64 and PlayStation versions received "average" reviews, according to the review aggregation website Metacritic. Greg Orlando of NextGen wrote of the former console version: "In Blitzs world all roughness is necessary – and quite fun, to boot." The Palm Beach Post staff writer David Thomas game the same console version a mixed review. He wrote that the game had "poor graphics for a Dreamcast game" and featured "awkward [...] controls", but he enjoyed the arcade mode. In a positive review, The Atlanta Journal-Constitution writer Michael Carvell called the game "cartoonish yet fun" and praised the graphics.

Human Tornado of GamePro said, "The latest Blitz for the Dreamcast is not a huge improvement over the last one, but there is enough here for true Blitz fans to pick up the sequel. For the rest of you who haven't experienced NFL Blitz yet, Blitz 2001 is a great football game that concentrates on action and fun." However, Vicious Sid said of the Nintendo 64 version, "Clearly, the Blitz series is in dire need of a top-to-bottom makeover. Though the rowdy pigskin-meets-WWF formula oozes potential, this year's edition barely limps onto the field. As it stands, Blitz 2001 is only a second-string effort; save your cash for Madden." The D-Pad Destroyer said that the PlayStation version "was a good idea when it started, but it has a lot of growing up to do to remain interesting. Hardnosed action football fans will lap this one up like a bowl of milk, but more hardcore armchair quarterbacks will want Madden or GameDay in their offensive line."

Notes

References

External links
 

2000 video games
American football video games
Dreamcast games
Nintendo 64 games
North America-exclusive video games
PlayStation (console) games
Video games developed in the United States